Liudmyla Starytska-Cherniakhivska (17 August 1868, Kyiv, Ukraine – 1941, unknown) was a Ukrainian writer, translator, and literary critic.

Family 
Born into a family of Ukrainian intelligentsia, Liudmyla Starytska-Cherniakhivska grew up in an atmosphere of appreciation of the arts and national values. An adherence to the nationalistic ideals became the cause of the tragic end of Liudmyla Starytska-Cherniakhivska's life as well as the lives of many members of her family, which was orchestrated by the Stalinist regime promulgating its Russification policy.

Liudmyla Starytska-Cherniakhivska's family members include:
 Father – Mykhailo Starytsky (2 December 1840 – 14 April 1904) was a writer, poet, play-writer and a co-founder of Ukrainian theatre traditions.
 Uncle – Mykola Lysenko (10 March 1842 – 24 October 1912) was a famous composer.
 Sister – Oksana Steshenko (1875–1941) was a writer, translator and teacher. Oksana Steshenko was exiled and died in a Soviet concentration camp in Kazakhstan or en route.
 Husband – Oleksandr Cherniakhivskyi (13 November 1869 – 22 December 1939) was a public figure and doctor. Together with his wife, Oleksandr Cherniakhivskyi was tried during the Trial of the Union for the Liberation of Ukraine.
 Daughter – Veronika Cherniakhivska (25 April 1900 – 22 September 1938) was a poet and translator. The Soviet government arrested Veronika Cherniakhivska twice, in 1929 and 1938. On 22 September 1938 she was sentenced to death. The execution was carried out the same day.

Arrests and death 
Liudmyla Starytska-Cherniakhivska in 1919 became a co-founder and deputy president of the National Council of Ukrainian Women.

In her sixties Liudmyla was first arrested and convicted during a show-trial of the Union for the Liberation of Ukraine in 1930, with 44 other defendants. She was imprisoned and exiled. In June 1941 the 73-year-old woman was again arrested and accused of carrying out anti-Soviet activities. She was tortured. Liudmyla Starytska-Cherniakhivska died during the journey to exile in Kazakhstan and her body was thrown from the train at a location still unknown.

Major works 
Liudmyla Starytska-Cherniakhivska wrote poetry, prose, drama, memoirs and literary criticism for various publications including the Lviv almanac, Pershyi Vinok.

Dramatic works 
1913 – Wings ('Kryla')

1917 – The Last Sheaf ('Ostanniy snip')

1918 – Hetman Petro Doroshenko

1926 – Bandit Karmeliuk ('Rozbiynyk Karmeliuk')

1927 – Ivan Mazepa

Memoirs 
Liudmyla Starytska-Cherniakhivska's memoirs include:
Twenty-Five Years of Ukrainian Theatre. Reflections and Thoughts
 Minutes of Lesia Ukrainka's Life
 Recollections about M. Lysenko
 V. Samiylenko. In Memory of a Friend

Other literary works 
1893 – Before the Storm, is a historical novel, which was published in instalments in Pravda, Lviv journal, during 1893–1894. The author never finished the novel.

1899 – The Living Grave ('Zhyva Mohyla') was Liudmyla Starytska-Cherniakhivska's first major work. The novel was published in Kyivan Antiquity journal. The topic of the novel is the love of two young people. The story is intertwined with the elements of Ukrainian folklore and legends. There is some parallel between The Living Grave and Shakespeare's Romeo and Juliet along with Gottfried August Bürger's Lenore. The novel is also a fine representative piece of Ukrainian Romantism and reminiscent of such earlier Ukrainian Romantic works as Levko Borovykovskyi's ballad Marusia (1829) and Mykola Hohol's (Nikolai Gogol) long tale A Terrible Vengeance (1831–32).

In 2015 Sova Books published its English translation of The Living Grave. One of the interesting facts about the publication is that on its cover the book depicts Daryna, the main heroine of the story and as a little tribute to the author of the story the publisher reproduced her face relying on one of Liudmyla Starytska-Cherniakhivska's photographs.

1929 – Diamond Ring ('Diamantovyi persten') was finished by the author six weeks before her first arrest. The manuscript remained unpublished for 64 years, until it appeared in Zona journal in 1993.

References 

1868 births
1941 deaths
20th-century Ukrainian women writers
Ukrainian memoirists
Poets from Kyiv
Ukrainian translators
Ukrainian literary critics
Women literary critics
Ukrainian language activists
Ukrainian dramatists and playwrights
Members of the Central Council of Ukraine
Theatre people from Kyiv
People from Kamianets-Podilskyi
20th-century Ukrainian women politicians